Speedball, also called speed pool, is a solitary pool game.  As its name suggests, one  all the pool balls on the table as quickly as possible.  It can be played competitively with the aid of a stopwatch.

Rules
The  must not be in motion when shooting
 can still be in motion when shooting
Ball and pocket must be , (No  the balls in)
Legal shots must be made — a 10-second penalty will be incurred for each .
Any ball may be pocketed, except that the  must be last.

Tournaments
Because speedball is a relatively recent development in pool, there are few tournaments devoted to it. One notable event was the International Speed Pool Challenge which was broadcast on ESPN. The games played in this event included one based on straight pool as well as the more common version described above, which is derived from eight-ball. The object in each match was to play all games with a shorter total time than other players. Luc Salvas was the first to win this event, which had a US$50,000 winner-take-all purse that year.

Notable professional players
Dave Pearson ("the Ginger Wizard")
Luc Salvas
Jeanette Lee ("the Black Widow")
Bobby McGrath ("the Kid")

References

One set of rules, from the Valley National Eight-ball Association

Pool (cue sports)